Adrian Mark Aucoin (born July 3, 1973) is a Canadian former professional ice hockey defenceman. He played over 1,100 games in the National Hockey League (NHL). Aucoin was born in Ottawa, Ontario, but grew up in Gloucester, Ontario.

Playing career 
As a youth, Aucoin played in the 1987 Quebec International Pee-Wee Hockey Tournament with a minor ice hockey team from Gloucester.

Aucoin was drafted 117th overall by the Vancouver Canucks in the 1992 NHL Entry Draft, making his NHL debut in 1994–95, playing one game with Vancouver. With the Canucks, Aucoin established himself as a significant offensive threat, specifically on the power play. However, it was not until his fourth full season with the team that this became evident, as he rose from just three goals in 1997–98 to 23 the next season, 18 of which came on the power-play, tying Denis Potvin for the NHL single-season record (broken by Sheldon Souray's 19 powerplay goals in 2006–07). In addition to leading all league defencemen in goals and power-play goals in the 1998–99 NHL season, Aucoin also led all defencemen in shorthanded goals (2) and game-winning goals (3).

However, after one-and-a-half seasons, Aucoin's offensive production dropped to the point where he had only 3 goals through 47 games in 2000–01. On February 7, 2001, Aucoin (along with a second-round pick for the 2001 NHL Entry Draft) was traded to the Tampa Bay Lightning for goaltender Dan Cloutier. He only played 26 regular-season games for the Lightning before being traded in the off-season with Alexander Kharitonov to the New York Islanders in exchange for Mathieu Biron and a second-round pick in the 2002 NHL Entry Draft.

With the Islanders, Aucoin put up the most consistent offensive numbers of his career, including a career-high 33 assists and 44 points in 2003–04, resulting in him being chosen to play in the 2004 NHL All-Star Game for the Eastern Conference. He shared a victory in the hardest shot competition with Sheldon Souray of the Montreal Canadiens with a 102.2 mph blast and scored the first goal of the game in a 6–4 win over the Western Conference.

In 2004–05, he played Modo Hockey in the Swedish Elitserien during the NHL lockout. After NHL play resumed, on August 2, 2005, Aucoin signed a four-year contract with the Chicago Blackhawks, eventually being named team captain. However, the first two seasons of his contract were hampered by injuries, and in the off-season prior to the 2007–08 campaign, Aucoin waived his no-trade clause and was sent with a seventh-round draft pick to the Calgary Flames in exchange for defencemen Andrei Zyuzin and Steve Marr.

In his first season with Calgary, Aucoin recorded the fifth 30-point season of his career in 2007–08 with 35 points, and recorded his sixth 30-point season in the 2008–09 season with 34 points.

In the summer of 2009, Aucoin, as a free agent, signed a contract with the Phoenix Coyotes. He helped the Coyotes win the Pacific Division in 2012, where they advanced to the Western Conference finals.

After three seasons with the Coyotes, Aucoin left as a free agent to sign a one-year contract with the Columbus Blue Jackets on July 1, 2012. During the lockout shortened 2012–13 season, Aucoin served as an alternate captain with the Blue Jackets. In 36 games, he totalled just 4 assists, however added a needed veteran presence at the Blueline. In the summer of 2013, he became an unrestricted free agent.

On November 19, 2013, Aucoin announced his retirement from professional hockey. He will begin working with the Chicago Blackhawks' young defensive prospects.

Personal life
Aucoin's son Kyle was drafted in the sixth round, 156th overall, by the Detroit Red Wings in the 2020 NHL Entry Draft.

Career statistics

Regular season and playoffs

International

Awards 
Babe Pratt Trophy (Vancouver Canucks' best defenceman): 1999
 Selected to one NHL All-Star Game: 2004

Transactions 
June 20, 1992 – Drafted 117th overall in the 1992 NHL Entry Draft by the Vancouver Canucks
February 7, 2001 – Traded to the Tampa Bay Lightning with a 2nd round draft pick (2001 NHL Entry Draft) for Dan Cloutier
June 22, 2001 – Traded to the New York Islanders with Alexander Kharitonov  for Mathieu Biron and a 2nd round draft pick (2002 NHL Entry Draft)
August 2, 2005 – Signed a four-year deal with the Chicago Blackhawks
July 1, 2009 – Signed with the Phoenix Coyotes
July 1, 2012 – Signed with the Columbus Blue Jackets

See also 
List of NHL players with 1,000 games played

References

External links 
 
 
 
 
 

1973 births
Boston University Terriers men's ice hockey players
Calgary Flames players
Canadian ice hockey defencemen
Chicago Blackhawks captains
Chicago Blackhawks coaches
Chicago Blackhawks players
Columbus Blue Jackets players
Hamilton Canucks players
Ice hockey people from Ottawa
Ice hockey players at the 1994 Winter Olympics
Living people
Medalists at the 1994 Winter Olympics
Modo Hockey players
National Hockey League All-Stars
Nepean Raiders players
New York Islanders players
Olympic ice hockey players of Canada
Olympic medalists in ice hockey
Olympic silver medalists for Canada
Phoenix Coyotes players
Syracuse Crunch players
Tampa Bay Lightning players
Vancouver Canucks draft picks
Vancouver Canucks players
Canadian expatriate ice hockey players in Sweden
Canadian ice hockey coaches